

Films

LGBT
1977 in LGBT history
1977
1977